Fernando Moraes Pileggi (born 6 July 1999), known as Fernando Pileggi or simply Fernando, is a Brazilian footballer who plays as a right back for Grêmio Prudente.

Club career
Born in São Paulo, Fernando started his career with Grêmio Osasco in 2013. He moved to Paulista in the following year, playing for the under-15 and under-17 categories before joining Juventus-SP in 2016.

On 5 June 2018, Fernando signed a contract with Santos until December 2019, and was initially assigned to the under-20s. He made his senior debut with the B-team on 23 August, coming on as a second-half substitute in a 0–0 home draw against Santo André for the year's Copa Paulista.

Fernando made his professional – and Série A – debut on 20 December 2020, starting in a 0–1 away loss against Vasco da Gama but being replaced at half-time. The following 12 April, after one further appearance with the main squad, he was loaned to Série C side Santa Cruz for the season.

Fernando played only one match for Santa before rescinding his contract with Santos, which was due to expire in December, on 16 November 2021.

Career statistics

Honours
Grêmio Prudente
Campeonato Paulista Segunda Divisão: 2022

References

External links

1999 births
Living people
Footballers from São Paulo
Brazilian footballers
Association football defenders
Campeonato Brasileiro Série A players
Santos FC players
Santa Cruz Futebol Clube players